Boston is a city in Thomas County, Georgia, United States. As of the 2020 census, the city had a population of 1,207.

History
Boston was incorporated by the Georgia General Assembly in 1870. An early variant name was "Blue Springs"; the present name is after Thomas M. Boston, who found a medicinal spring near the town site. Boston, Georgia is home to one of the original Carnegie Libraries, and one of a handful in Georgia that is still being used as a library.

Geography
Boston is located at  (30.7926, -83.7907).

It is 107 miles east of Dothan, Alabama and 21 miles west of Valdosta.

Demographics

2020 census

Note: the US Census treats Hispanic/Latino as an ethnic category. This table excludes Latinos from the racial categories and assigns them to a separate category. Hispanics/Latinos can be of any race.

2000 Census
As of the census of 2000, there were 1,417 people, 553 households, and 382 families residing in the city. The racial makeup of the city was 30.77% White, 67.61% African American, 0.07% Native American, 0.28% from other races, and 1.27% from two or more races. Hispanic or Latino of any race were 2.19% of the population.

There were 553 households, out of which 34.0% had children younger than age 18 living with them, 33.8% were married couples living together, 29.5% had a female householder with no husband present, and 30.9% were non-families. 28.0% of all households were made up of individuals, and 13.0% had someone living alone who was 65 years of age or older. The average household size was 2.56 and the average family size was 3.13.

In the city, the population was spread out, with 31.1% younger than age 18, 6.8% from 18 to 24, 27.0% from 25 to 44, 21.9% from 45 to 64, and 13.1% who were 65 years of age or older. The median age was 35 years. For every 100 females, there were 83.8 males. For every 100 females age 18 and older, there were 74.9 males.

The median income for a household in the city was $19,313 and the median income for a family was $23,920. Males had a median income of $20,605 versus $17,135 for females. The per capita income for the city was $9,622. About 29.8% of families and 32.9% of the population were below the poverty line, including 42.9% of those younger than age 18 and 28.8% of those age 65 or older.

References

External links

http://www.bostonga.com/

Cities in Georgia (U.S. state)
Cities in Thomas County, Georgia